TMK may refer to:

 OAO TMK, a Russian pipe producer
 TMK, Soviet Union Mars bound space exploration project
 Tillamook Airport, Oregon, USA, FAA identifier
 Torchmark Corporation, NYSE symbol
 Touch My Katamari, a PlayStation Vita game 
  Tees Maar Khan, Bollywood movie and its protagonist
 Türk Maarif Koleji, school in Northern Cyprus
 TM Krishna, Indian singer
 Tai'an railway station (Shandong), China Railway telegraph code TMK